Ion A. Rădulescu-Pogoneanu (born Ion A. Rădulescu; 14 August 1870 – 14 March 1945) was a Romanian pedagogue.

Biography
Born in 1870 in Pogoanele, Buzău County, he studied for six years at Leipzig University, obtaining his doctorate in Philosophy in July 1901 with thesis Über das Leben und die Philosophie Contas. He then became a professor at the University of Bucharest, and was elected a corresponding member of the Romanian Academy in 1919. A contributor to Convorbiri Literare and România Jună magazines, he helped popularize knowledge of pedagogy in his country. Among his works are a biography of Johann Heinrich Pestalozzi, a book on the phenomenon of education, and one on the problems of Romanian culture. He was a follower of Titu Maiorescu's ideas. His wife Elena was a girls' school director; he had a daughter and two sons, including Victor Rădulescu-Pogoneanu, who became diplomats.

Publications

Notes

1870 births
1945 deaths
People from Pogoanele
Romanian educational theorists
Romanian essayists
Academic staff of the University of Bucharest
Corresponding members of the Romanian Academy
Leipzig University alumni